Tafadzwa Rusike (born 7 May 1989 in Harare) is a Zimbabwean professional footballer, who plays as a winger for ZESCO United.

Club career

CAPS United F.C.
Tafadzwa Rusike made his professional debut in the Zimbabwe Premier Soccer League for CAPS United F.C., signing with the club in January 2008, and finishing the 2007-08 season, Tafadzwa Rusike played for CAPS for the next two seasons, before transferring to the South African club Ajax Cape Town.

Ajax Cape Town
Tafadzwa Rusike made his professional debut in the South African PSL for Ajax Cape Town on 27 August 2010 in a 2-0 win against Bloemfontein Celtic at Green Point Stadium in Cape Town. He was acquired by Ajax Cape Town in the summer of 2010 as a transfer from Zimbabwean club CAPS United F.C. Rusike was joined at Ajax by CAPS club mate Khama Billiat, who had also transferred to the Cape club in the off-season. He played for three seasons with the team, and departed the Urban Warriors at the end of the 2012-13 season.

Dynamos
Tafadzwa Rusike has sign for Dynamos.

International career

International goals
Scores and results list Zimbabwe's goal tally first.

Honours

Club
Ajax Cape Town
2010 Telkom Knockout: Finalist

References

External links

Living people
1989 births
Zimbabwean footballers
Zimbabwean expatriate footballers
Zimbabwe international footballers
CAPS United players
Cape Town Spurs F.C. players
Dynamos F.C. players
Progresso Associação do Sambizanga players
Zanaco F.C. players
ZESCO United F.C. players
South African Premier Division players
Association football forwards
Association football midfielders
Zimbabwean expatriate sportspeople in South Africa
Zimbabwean expatriate sportspeople in Zambia
Expatriate soccer players in South Africa
Expatriate footballers in Angola
Expatriate footballers in Zambia